Caitlin Fryers is an Irish boxer. She participated in the 2022 Women's European Amateur Boxing Championships, winning the silver medal in the light flyweight event. She also competed at the 2017 AIBA Youth Women's World Boxing Championships and 2022 European U22 Boxing Championships.

References

External links 

Living people
Place of birth missing (living people)
Year of birth missing (living people)
Irish women boxers
Light-flyweight boxers
21st-century Irish women